In mathematical logic, a tolerant sequence is a sequence 

,..., 

of formal theories such that there are consistent extensions 

,..., 

Tolerance naturally generalizes from sequences of theories to trees of theories. Weak interpretability can be shown to be a special, binary case of tolerance. 

This concept, together with its dual concept of cotolerance, was introduced by  Japaridze in 1992, who also proved that, for Peano arithmetic and any stronger theories with effective axiomatizations, tolerance is equivalent to -consistency.

See also 
Interpretability
Cointerpretability
Interpretability logic

References
 G. Japaridze, The logic of linear tolerance. Studia Logica 51 (1992), pp. 249–277.
 G. Japaridze, A generalized notion of weak interpretability and the corresponding logic. Annals of Pure and Applied Logic 61 (1993), pp. 113–160.
 G. Japaridze and D. de Jongh, The logic of provability. Handbook of Proof Theory. S. Buss, ed. Elsevier, 1998, pp. 476–546.

Proof theory